Kah Kyung Cho (June 7, 1927 - January 15, 2022) was a Korean-American philosopher. He specialized in phenomenology, hermeneutics, contemporary German philosophy, and East-West comparative philosophy.  He had worked with continental philosophers such as Martin Heidegger and Hans-Georg Gadamer. He taught at State University of New York (SUNY) from 1971 to 2017 & took retirement as a SUNY Distinguished Teaching Professor. Cho's seminars have traditionally centered on discussions anchored in close textual and hermeneutical readings of works in the phenomenological tradition, including Heidegger's Fundamental Concepts of Metaphysics, Being and Time, and Gadamer's Truth and Method.

Education
Cho graduated from Seoul National University in South Korea in 1952, and then went to the University of Heidelberg in Germany to pursue a Ph.D., completing it in 1957.

Career
Cho became a professor at SUNY in 1971, and since then has also served as a visiting professor at a number of institutions including the University of Bochum in Germany and Osaka University in Japan. Dr. Cho was awarded the Fulbright Senior Research Professorship Award in 1961, the Alexander von Humboldt Foundation Research Grant in 1989, and 1997.

Philosophy 
In his attempt to bring Asian thought to the attention of Western readers, Cho adopted a markedly different approach from that of Japanese philosophers, as Landgrebe pointed out. While most Japanese are used to relying on their own Zen Buddhist tradition as the basis for assimilating Western philosophy, Cho appealed to more original Chinese sources of Taoism and Neo-Confucianism in order to implement a much wider ranging conversation between the two traditions. The most important tool for this cross cultural research, for Cho, is Husserl's phenomenology. It is significant not only for its methodical thrust into the depth dimension of conscious and subconscious experience. Phenomenology provides, as Cho often emphasizes, the purest "optical instrument" with built-in possibilities for self-correction. If philosophy is in its essence the pursuit of self-knowledge, then the objectives for Asian philosophers are clearly mapped from the beginning. They are called upon to turn to their own traditions and engage their Western colleagues in conversations based on what they can positively contribute to sharing a higher and better level of knowledge.

Selected publications
The following is a partial list of publications by Kah-Kyung Cho.
 Philosophy and Science in Phenomenological Perspective (ed.), Phaenomenologica 95, Dordrecht 1984
 Bewusstsein und Natursein, Phänomenologischer West-Ost Diwan, Freiburg 1987 (Japanese translation, 1994)
 Phänomenologie der Natur (ed.), Freiburg, 1999
 Phänomenologie in Korea (ed.), Freiburg, 2001

See also
American philosophy
List of American philosophers

Notes

External links 
 Faculty profile at SUNY
 Personal profile at Buffalo
 An expanding mind
 Kah Kyung Cho (1927-2022)

1927 births
2022 deaths
20th-century American philosophers
21st-century American philosophers
American academics of Korean descent
American writers of Korean descent
Seoul National University alumni
South Korean emigrants to the United States
South Korean expatriates in Germany
Heidelberg University alumni
Academic staff of Osaka University
Phenomenologists
Hermeneutists
Continental philosophers
Philosophers of mind
Gadamer scholars
Heidegger scholars
State University of New York faculty
Academic staff of Ruhr University Bochum